The 1980 Miami Hurricanes baseball team represented the University of Miami in the 1980 NCAA Division I baseball season. The Hurricanes played their home games at Mark Light Field. The team was coached by Ron Fraser in his 18th season at Miami.

The Hurricanes reached the College World Series, where they were eliminated in the semifinals after recording wins against Clemson and Michigan and losses to eventual runner-up Hawaii and third-place .

Personnel

Roster

Coaches

Schedule and results

References

Miami Hurricanes baseball seasons
Miami Hurricanes
College World Series seasons
Miami Hurricanes baseball